Unieście  (German: Nest) is a coastal village in the administrative district of Gmina Mielno, within Koszalin County, West Pomeranian Voivodeship, in north-western Poland.

Before 1637 the area was part of Duchy of Pomerania. For the history of the region, see History of Pomerania.

Unieście has a population of 1,000. Together with Mielno, which it adjoins to the west, it serves as a popular seaside resort. The two villages lie on a spit between the Baltic Sea and Jamno lake.

References

Villages in Koszalin County